Ved Stranden 16 is a narrow, mid18th-century property]] located opposite Christiansborg Palace in central Copenhagen, Denmark. The building was listed on the Danish registry of protected buildings and places in 1918. It is flanked by the former Hotel Royal to the left and the Gustmeyer House to the right.

History

18th century
The site was in 1689 as No. 219 owned by kancelliforvalter Rasmus Rasmussen. The building was together with most of the other buildings in the area destroyed in the Copenhagen Fire of 1728. The property was later acquired by General War Commissioner Stephen Hansen. He commissioned Philip de Lange to construct a new building in 1748. Philip de Lange, whom he knew from the Royal Copenhagen Shooting Society, had most likely already built a new main building at Hellebækgård for him. Hansen had also acquired the adjacent No. 205 in Admiralgade on the other side of the block.  
Hansen resigned from the military in 1750 to focus on his career as an industrialist and merchant in Helsingør where de Lange constructed the Stephen Hansen Mansion for him in 1754, In 1756, he still owned the two properties in Copenhagen which as of 1755 were known as No. 250 (formerly No. 213) and No. 241 (formerly No. 205).

19th century

Lange's building by the canal (No. 250) was one of few buildings in the area that survived the Copenhagen Fire of 1795.

Mp- 250 was at the time of the 1801 census home to a total of 19 people. Vallentin Madsen, a sugar manufacturer, resided there with his wife and four children. 

No. 250 and No. 241 were after the fire merged with a third property in Admiralgade (No. 242). The large new property was in the new cadastre of 1806 listed as No. 153 and it was by then owned by sugar manufacturer V. Madsen.

The property No. 153 was at the time of the 1840 census home to a total of 17 people. The just 2+ years old Peter Mac Evay	resided alone on the first floor. Jürgen Fr, the manager of a sugar house, resided with his wife, three children and a maid on the second floor.iederich Garven	
 Iwer Valentin Christian Dresler	, a 29-year-old employee in a trading firm (handelsbetjent), resided along on the ground floor.

The property was in the first half of the 1840s owned by a merchant named Harboe. He heightened the building in Ved Stranden in 1844 and constructed a new building in Admiralgade. In 1845, he divided the property into two properties, No. 153A in Ved Stranden and No. 153B In Admiralgade. With the introduction of house numbering by street in 1859 (as opposed to the old cadastral numbers by quarter), No. 153A became known as Ved Stranden 16. The property at Ved Stranden 16 was in the middle of the 19th century owned by a wholesale merchant named Harboe.

No. 153 A was at the tome of the 1750 census home to a total of 22 people. Herman Feincke Stahl, a textile manufacturer, resided with his wife, daughter, sister-in-law, niece and a maid on the ground floor.Poul Eduard Moritz Löbel, a hotelier, resided with his wife and three servants on the first floor.

Frederick August Baggesen, an army colonel, was residing with his wife, four children and a maid on the third floor.

20th century

Limfjordskompagniet, a manufacturer of shellfish from Mors, opened an outlet in the basement in the 1910s.

Kraks Fond, which had until then been based in the Krak House on Nytorv, was a tenant in the building from 1898. It is now based in Fæstningens Materialgård.

Architecture
 

Philip de Lange's original building consisted of three floors over a high cellar and the facade was crowned by a pediment. The building was heightened with one floor for Harboe in 1844–46. The building is four bays wide of which the two outer bays are slightly recessed. The windows are brown painted and the two central windows on the three lower floors are framed in sandstone. The two central windows on the bel étage are topped by open pediments with reliefs of fruit baskets. A cornice supported by corbels line the top of the building. The roof is clad with red tile and features three dormer windows.

A gateway flanked by two lanterns is located in the left hand side of the ground floor (north) while a short flight of stairs in the second bay from the right leads down to the basement. The gateway opens to a narrow courtyard. A doorway in the south wall of the gateway affords access to the main staircase of the building.

Two consecutive side wings project from the rear side of the building. The first one is six bays long and dates from 1795. The second one is four bays long and dates from1705. Both of them were originally three storeys high but were heightened together with the front wing in 1844.

Today
The ground floor is home to a cava bar. Rud Pedersen, a public affairs agency, is based on the second floor.

References

External links

 Xava Bar Playa
 Source

Listed residential buildings in Copenhagen